Irvine Victoria Football Club is a Scottish football club, based in the town of Irvine, North Ayrshire. Nicknamed Wee Vics and "Westenders", it was formed in 1904 and plays at Victoria Park, in Irvine. Club colours are orange, blue and white stripes.

The club's local rival is Irvine Meadow XI.

On 24 May 2018 Brian McLuckie became Manager of the club.

On 10 June 2021 Brian McLuckie resigned as Manager of the club.

On June 28 2021, Irvine Vics have announced Dougie MacDuff as their new manager.

Ground 

The club play at Victoria Park. The ground is only 300 yards away from Irvine railway station. It has two covered enclosures and some concrete terracing.

Honours won
Ayrshire District League Champions: 2013–14
Ayrshire (Ardrossan & Saltcoats Herald) Cup: 1952–53
Ayrshire League (Kerr & Smith) Cup: 1951–52, 1953–54, 1973–74
Ayrshire District (Irvine Times) Cup: 1934–35
Ayrshire League Cup: 1973–74
Cunninghame Cup: 1984–85, 1988–89
North Ayrshire Cup: 1998–99
Irvine & District League: 1919–20

Management team 
Managers: Brian McLuckie
Assistant Manager: Mark McCann
Coach: Tam Jamieson

Committee 
Chairman: Vacant
Vice Chairman: Shaw Donaldson
Secretary: David Loach
Treasurer: William Loach
Minute Secretary: William Loach
Committee Members: Aimee Loach, David Mill, Stephen Broomhall & Mike Hall

Past players  

   Hugh Arkinson (Kilmarnock)
   John Boyd (Greenock Morton, Clydebank & Motherwell)
   Alex Brown (Partick Thistle, Preston North End & Carlisle United) 
   George Caldwell (Arbroath)
   Alex Elliot (Cowdenbeath & Airdrie)
   Ian Fraser (Ayr United)
   Billy Fulton (Ayr United, Falkirk & St.Mirren)
   John Hollywood (Queen Of The South)
   Iain Jardine (Kilmarnock, Partick Thistle, Anorthosis (Cyprus), Heart of Midlothian
   Charlie Kerr (Greenock Morton, Carlisle United, Portadown & Barrow)
   Ian Kerr (Kilmarnock)
   Bobby Lawrie (Portsmouth)
   Ronnie McCall (Ayr United & Stranraer)
   John McCulloch (Queen Of The South)
   Chris McGowan (Albion Rovers)
   Johnny McIlwaine (Falkirk, Portsmouth and Southampton)
   Ron McNeil (Raith Rovers & Weymouth)
   Jim Muir (Motherwell, Dumbarton, Adelaide City & Marconi-Fairfield)
   George O'Donnell (Ayr United & Montrose)
   Gary Russell (Queen Of The South & Albion Rovers)
   Joe Wark (Motherwell)
   Kerr Whiteside (Manchester United)

References

External links 
 Irvine Victoria FC website

 
Football clubs in Scotland
Scottish Junior Football Association clubs
Football in North Ayrshire
Association football clubs established in 1904
1904 establishments in Scotland
Irvine, North Ayrshire
West of Scotland Football League teams